Centaur of the North, a collection of short stories linked by common words, plot elements, and themes, was written by South Texas author Wendell Mayo (Houston: Arte Público, 1996), with a second printing in 1999. This first short story collection by Corpus Christi author Wendell Mayo won the Premio Aztlán Literary Prize in 1996. The stories' settings move between Corpus Christi in South Texas and various cities in the Midwest, and they focus on families of dual heritage and the ideas of rootedness, tradition, language, and truth.

Common themes 
The setting of the collection, which is in South Texas and the Midwest in the latter part of the twentieth century, becomes one of the collection's subjects. Corpus Christi, which is located on the South Texas coast an hour and a half from Mexico's borders, evokes a set of questions upon which the work focuses. How can one find an identity among the fabrications, truths, half-truths and myths which have been woven into stories and passed down the generations? How can two linguistic heritages, Spanish and English—lengua and tongue—refer to a single truth (See multilingualism)?

The Midwest is where the mother-character who appears in many of these stories longs to be immersed in a Hispanic culture that she has left behind in Texas. The children that appear in Mayo's stories hear their parents speak mystifying words in Spanish, or performing healing rituals such as that to banish el mal ojo (the evil eye; see Curandero) that leave them confused. Pictured growing up in traditional Mexican kitchens where lengua (tongue) is cooked and tales are spun, on the beach, or in suburban schoolrooms and living-rooms, the children try to choose between their Mexican and their American roots. Despite the central characters’ attempts to discover and own their real roots, they find themselves mystified or repelled by the foreignness of a world that should be familiar.

Connections with Pancho Villa 
Francisco Villa, called Pancho Villa (1878–1923), was styled "The Centaur of the North" because of his campaigns on horseback in northern Mexico, where he divested the patrón and hacienda system of some of its power. Children raised in families of Mexican heritage on both sides of the border share stories and legends about Villa, comparing him with Robin Hood. Villa, photographed on his horse with crossed bandoliers, is a memorable icon for small boys with heroic urges. 

In the short story "Centaur of the North," The first-person narrator's mystification over his older relatives' tales of Pancho Villa are complicated by differences in age and a cultural remove. Villa might as well be a mythological character, for all the protagonist understands about him, yet longs for a more heroic age.

Connections with mythological figures 
The teaching role often attributed to the half-man, half-horse figure of the centaur in mythology does not appear in Mayo's stories; the role of the warrior Centaurs does appear, mostly in the stories “The Centaur of the North” and “Conquistador.” However, the figure of the Centaur does body forth the idea of beings whose two heritages pull them in different directions, and in the idea of a mythology that still has the power to move us today.

Synopses of stories 
 In “The Stone Kitchen,” the first story in the collection, the first-person narrator tries to understand his own history by listening to his mother's conflicting tales of her past. Silvia's, the mother's, tales place her in Italy, in Piedras Negras, Guatemala, and Vermont. While the places are different, all Silvia's stories revolve around houses, stones, people, food, and loneliness.
 In “Conquistador,” the first-person narrator recalls how his grandmother, Eva, told him tales of a distant relative and conquistador, Franscisco Durante, who named Corpus Christi. Inspired by his grandfather's World War I-era gear kept in an old trunk, the boy wonders what, in the modern (and seemingly diminished) world he has inherited, he can conquer.
 In “The Centaur of the North,” the boy's grandfather tells stories of having met Pancho Villa. Every time he tells the story, it changes. Often, the changes substitute the heroic for the commonplace. In the end, the family does not know whether his stories are "true" or no.
 In “The Banker’s Son,” a boy, Eolo,  is on a quest for his missing father, only to find out that his father had visited his mother at night and sometimes hit her. During the period of the story, Eolo's mother enacts healing rituals of curanderismo that, connected with his mother's other bizarre behaviors, Eolo's school friends deride as being irrational, loco.
 In “Soledad,” the youngest child of Blanche Sylvia Hammond describes his siblings as having designated family roles. After the family moves from Corpus Christi, Texas to Athens, Ohio, Blanche Sylvia becomes homesick, and the narrator tries desperately to understand which role his mother plays in the otherwise structured family. After a spate of increasingly erratic behavior, Blanche Sylvia kills herself after leaving the word soledad (solitude) written in her kitchen.
 In “La Villa, La Villa Miseria,” Gloria Milagros Durant struggles with her aging father, Mariano, who tells stories of the stones of La Villa in Spain, where he grew up. Gloria struggles with the disjunction between the  romanticism with which her father portrays his early life and the poverty and meanness around her in her current life.
 In “New Moon,” people of different backgrounds at a neighborhood barbecue judge a woman of Hispanic heritage on her appearance and actions. The first-person narrator, who is scarred by recent heart surgery, helps the woman with her lawnmower, which leads to better understanding between the suburban neighbors.
 In “El Ojo,”
 In “Corpus,” the ninth and final story, the narrator longs to return to his roots and visits Corpus Christi. In this South Texas city, he searches for his past, only to learn that he cannot go home again. The story unfolds, not in any chronology, but as a montage of images of the present and the past.

1996 short story collections
American short story collections